Máriahalom ( or ) is a village in Komárom-Esztergom county, Hungary. It is around 30 km north-west of Budapest.

External links 
 Street map (Hungarian)
 Photos, links of Mariahalom (English)

Populated places in Komárom-Esztergom County
Hungarian German communities